The Green Youth (GJ) is the youth organisation linked to Bündnis 90/Die Grünen.

History
The Grüne Jugend was founded on 16 January 1994, as an independent association with the name Grün-Alternatives Jugendbündnis (abbreviated: GAJB).

Before 1994 there were, after the first attempts in Niedersachsen like Grüne Jugend Braunschweig, founded in the spring of 1981, several state-based associations, such as the Grüne Jugend Hessen, which had been founded in the spring of 1991. It used and still uses a frog as its logo. In the same spring the Grün-Alternative Jugend Baden-Württemberg was founded. Parallel to these state-based organisations was the federal Bundesjugendkontaktstelle (Abbreviated: BUJUKS), a loose network of young members and sympathisers of Die Grünen.

After several years of debate, a federal green youth organisation was founded, in which the state-based organisations and the BUJUKS all merged. In 2001, the GJ became an integral part of the Die Grünen and lost its independent status.

Ideology
Although it has similar positions to its motherparty, there are some differences. The GJ for instance is in favour of legalisation of all drugs and the use of free software.

Organization
The GRÜNE JUGEND is a Basisgruppe within Alliance 90/The Greens ( or ). It has about 15,000 members. Some of these are members of state-based organisations, while others are direct members of the federal organisation. Membership of the youth organisation currently represents about 15% of the membership of the main party. Membership of the organisation ends in the year one becomes 28-years-old.

The highest organ of the party is the federal congress, in which all members can participate and vote. It elects the board with two speakers, the editors of the party-magazine, SPUNK and the board of arbitration. There is a strict rule that the board, the two speakers and all other elected groups at any level must consist of at least 50% women, inter or trans persons, same as in the mother party. This is to ensure equal treatment. In the months that the federal congress does not meet a federal council, consisting out of two members per state-based organisations, meets. There are also several thematic fora, which work on specific themes (e.g. Europe, Democracy, Drugs, Equal treatment).

The GJ is a member of the Federation of Young European Greens and Global Young Greens

References

External links
 Website of the Grüne Jugend

Alliance 90/The Greens
Drug policy of Germany
Free software
Youth wings of political parties in Germany
Youth wings of green parties in Europe
Youth organizations established in 1994